Hansruedi Märki (born 18 June 1960) is a Swiss former cyclist. He competed in the team pursuit event at the 1984 Summer Olympics.

References

External links
 

1960 births
Living people
Swiss male cyclists
Olympic cyclists of Switzerland
Cyclists at the 1984 Summer Olympics